Sandade Sandadi ( Total Pleasantness) is a 2002 Telugu-language comedy film directed by Muppalaneni Shiva. It stars Jagapathi Babu, Rajendra Prasad, Sivaji, Urvasi, Raasi, Sanghavi, and music composed by Koti. The film was a remake of the Kannada film Kothigalu Saar Kothigalu (2001), which was remade in Hindi as Shaadi No. 1 (2005) and also remade into Bengali (Bangladesh) as Tomakei Khujchi (2008).

Plot
Sandade Sandadi is a family drama-based movie in which 3 besties, Chandu, Balu, & Kamesh, are vexed with their wives Lakshmi, Vasundhara, & Priya as their earnings are less. Hence, they decide to take a mass suicide that ends up securing a tycoon Lakshmi Narayana / Lucky who too attempted suicide because of bankruptcy. The guys aid him in straightening his business and earning a good salary. All of them reside in a group of apartments and their family also share close intimacy. Fitting Parvati the common servant of 3 shares with ladies beyond relation. Plus, she is eagerly waiting for her childhood crush Raja who has been detached. Parallelly, the 3 suffer as their wives do not allow them to marital life. Lakshmi is highly devotional and spends her days with Vratams. Vasundhara is a busy lawyer that is dedicated to her work. Priya is a hotshot TV actress endearing the camera. 

Besides, Lucky is confronted with a second issue as he betrothed his daughters Honey, Anju, & Manju nuptial with his close friend's sons. Anyhow, the 3 modern foreign returned fines are rapid that intended to let a love match. At that point, the 3 guide Lucky to employ 3 good-looking guys to infatuate his daughters. Later, forge them as fraudulent so that the beauties can realize love is trash and accept their father's proposal. Here, Lucky orders these 3 to do the roles which they turn down and further accept since the job threat. As of today, the 3 triumphs attract the lovelies and the day arrives for ditching when Lucky is hostile toward them which rages their ego. Moreover, they are habituated to five-star luxuries and find it discouraging. Ergo, they ploy to artifice Lucky by knitting his daughters. 

Meanwhile, Fitting Parvati spots the husbands with their girlfriends and notifies their wives which they do not believe due to their strong trust in men. Now the 3 be bribe Parvati, ruse to slay her via a goon, Pulan Raja. Stunningly, he turns into Parvati's beloved and they mingle. Therefrom, Parvati attempts several plays to crack the truth but to avail. After a few comic incidents, Lucky discovers the 3 as foes and asks to discard the mission when they contradict, he alerts the wives. Whereat, they play a counterattack when the 3 choose the darlings and quit them. Here, Lakshmi collapses, and Vasundhara & Priya lands for the wedding of their husbands as witnesses at the registered office. Being conscious of Lakshmi's condition, the 3 rush to the hospital, divulging the actuality to the brides. Thus, enranged babes seek to kill them when Fitting Parvati discloses that their father is the true killer when they reform. At last, the husbands beg pardon from their wives after the soul-searching, and they do so. As well as, Lucky also seeks forgiveness. Finally, the movie ends on a happy note with Lucky wedding his daughters with his friend's sons.

Cast
Jagapathi Babu as Chandu / Chandra Sekhar
Rajendra Prasad as Balu / Balasubramanyam
Sivaji as Kamesh
Urvasi as Lakshmi Chandra Sekhar / Bondus
Raasi as Lawyer Vasundhara Balasubramanyam
Sanghavi as Priya Kamesh
Sonali Joshi as Honey
Sony Raj as Anju
Swapna Madhuri as Manju
Kota Srinivasa Rao as Lakshmi Narayana / Lucky
Brahmanandam as Poolan Raja
Ali as Divya's Assistant
Surya as Priya's director
Kovai Sarala as Fitting Parvathi
Shravya
Telangana Shakuntala as Kamesh's Mother-in-Law

Soundtrack

Music composed by Koti. Music released on ADITYA Music Company.

References

External links
 

2002 films
Telugu remakes of Kannada films
Indian comedy films
Films scored by Koti
2000s Telugu-language films
Films directed by Muppalaneni Shiva
2002 comedy films